

Events

Pre-1600
62 – Earthquake in Pompeii, Italy.
1576 – Henry of Navarre abjures Catholicism at Tours and rejoins the Protestant forces in the French Wars of Religion.
1597 – A group of early Japanese Christians are killed by the new government of Japan for being seen as a threat to Japanese society.

1601–1900
1783 – In Calabria, a sequence of strong earthquakes begins.
1810 – Peninsular War: Siege of Cádiz begins.
1818 – Jean-Baptiste Bernadotte ascends to the thrones of Sweden and Norway.
1852 – The New Hermitage Museum in Saint Petersburg, Russia, one of the largest and oldest museums in the world, opens to the public.
1859 – Alexandru Ioan Cuza, Prince of Moldavia, is also elected as prince of Wallachia, joining the two principalities as a personal union called the United Principalities, an autonomous region within the Ottoman Empire, which ushered in the birth of the modern Romanian state.
1862 – Moldavia and Wallachia formally unite to create the Romanian United Principalities.
1869 – The largest alluvial gold nugget in history, called the "Welcome Stranger", is found in Moliagul, Victoria, Australia.
1885 – King Leopold II of Belgium establishes the Congo as a personal possession.

1901–present
1901 – J. P. Morgan incorporates U.S. Steel in the state of New Jersey, although the company would not start doing business until February 25 and the assets of Andrew Carnegie's Carnegie Steel Company, Elbert H. Gary's Federal Steel Company, and William Henry Moore's National Steel Company were not acquired until April 1.
1905 – In Mexico, the General Hospital of Mexico is inaugurated, started with four basic specialties.
1907 – Belgian chemist Leo Baekeland announces the creation of Bakelite, the world's first synthetic plastic.
1913 – Greek military aviators, Michael Moutoussis and Aristeidis Moraitinis perform the first naval air mission in history, with a Farman MF.7 hydroplane.
  1913   – Claudio Monteverdi's last opera L'incoronazione di Poppea was performed theatrically for the first time in more than 250 years.
1917 – The current constitution of Mexico is adopted, establishing a federal republic with powers separated into independent executive, legislative, and judicial branches.
  1917   – The Congress of the United States passes the Immigration Act of 1917 over President Woodrow Wilson's veto. 
1918 – Stephen W. Thompson shoots down a German airplane; this is the first aerial victory by the U.S. military.
  1918   –  is torpedoed off the coast of Ireland; it is the first ship carrying American troops to Europe to be torpedoed and sunk.
1919 – Charlie Chaplin, Mary Pickford, Douglas Fairbanks, and D. W. Griffith launch United Artists.
1924 – The Royal Greenwich Observatory begins broadcasting the hourly time signals known as the Greenwich Time Signal.
1933 – Mutiny on Royal Netherlands Navy warship HNLMS De Zeven Provinciën off the coast of Sumatra, Dutch East Indies.
1939 – Generalísimo Francisco Franco becomes the 68th "Caudillo de España", or Leader of Spain.
1941 – World War II: Allied forces begin the Battle of Keren to capture Keren, Eritrea.
1945 – World War II: General Douglas MacArthur returns to Manila.
1958 – Gamal Abdel Nasser is nominated to be the first president of the United Arab Republic.
  1958   – A hydrogen bomb known as the Tybee Bomb is lost by the US Air Force off the coast of Savannah, Georgia, never to be recovered.
1962 – French President Charles de Gaulle calls for Algeria to be granted independence.
1963 – The European Court of Justice's ruling in Van Gend en Loos v Nederlandse Administratie der Belastingen establishes the principle of direct effect, one of the most important, if not the most important, decisions in the development of European Union law.
1967 – Cultural Revolution: The Shanghai People's Commune is formally proclaimed, with Yao Wenyuan and Zhang Chunqiao being appointed as its leaders.
1971 – Astronauts land on the Moon in the Apollo 14 mission.
1975 – Riots break out in Lima, Peru after the police forces go on strike the day before. The uprising (locally known as the Limazo) is bloodily suppressed by the military dictatorship.
1985 – Ugo Vetere, then the mayor of Rome, and Chedli Klibi, then the mayor of Carthage, meet in Tunis to sign a treaty of friendship officially ending the Third Punic War which lasted 2,131 years.
1988 – Manuel Noriega is indicted on drug smuggling and money laundering charges.
1994 – Byron De La Beckwith is convicted of the 1963 murder of civil rights leader Medgar Evers.
  1994   – Markale massacres, more than 60 people are killed and some 200 wounded as a mortar shell explodes in a downtown marketplace in Sarajevo.
1997 – The so-called Big Three banks in Switzerland announce the creation of a $71 million fund to aid Holocaust survivors and their families.
2000 – Russian forces massacre at least 60 civilians in the Novye Aldi suburb of Grozny, Chechnya.
2004 – Rebels from the Revolutionary Artibonite Resistance Front capture the city of Gonaïves, starting the 2004 Haiti rebellion.
2008 – A major tornado outbreak across the Southern United States kills 57.
2019 – Pope Francis becomes the first Pope in history to visit and perform papal mass in the Arabian Peninsula during his visit to Abu Dhabi.
2020 – United States President Donald Trump is acquitted by the United States Senate in his first impeachment trial.
2021 – Police riot in Mexico City as they try to break up a demonstration by cyclists who were protesting after a bus ran over a bicyclist. Eleven police officers are arrested.

Births

Pre-1600
 976 – Sanjō, emperor of Japan (d. 1017)
1321 – John II, marquess of Montferrat (d. 1372)
1438 – Philip II, duke of Savoy (d. 1497)
1505 – Aegidius Tschudi, Swiss statesman and historian (d. 1572)
1519 – René of Châlon, prince of Orange (d. 1544)
1525 – Juraj Drašković, Croatian Catholic cardinal (d. 1587)
1533 – Andreas Dudith, Croatian-Hungarian nobleman and diplomat (d. 1589)
1534 – Giovanni de' Bardi, Italian soldier, composer, and critic (d. 1612)
1589 – Esteban Manuel de Villegas, Spanish poet and educator (d. 1669)
1594 – Biagio Marini, Italian violinist and composer (d. 1663)

1601–1900
1608 – Gaspar Schott, German mathematician and physicist (d. 1666)
1626 – Marie de Rabutin-Chantal, marquise de Sévigné, French author (d. 1696)
1650 – Anne Jules de Noailles, French general (d. 1708)
1703 – Gilbert Tennent, Irish-American minister (d. 1764)
1723 – John Witherspoon, Scottish-American minister and academic (d. 1794)
1725 – James Otis, Jr., American lawyer and politician (d. 1783)
1748 – Christian Gottlob Neefe, German composer and conductor (d. 1798)
1788 – Robert Peel, English lieutenant and politician, Prime Minister of the United Kingdom (d. 1850)
1795 – Wilhelm Karl Ritter von Haidinger, Austrian mineralogist, geologist, and physicist (d. 1871)
1804 – Johan Ludvig Runeberg, Finnish poet and hymn-writer (d. 1877)
1808 – Carl Spitzweg, German painter and poet (d. 1885)
1810 – Ole Bull, Norwegian violinist and composer (d. 1880)
1827 – Peter Lalor, Irish-Australian activist and politician (d. 1889)
1837 – Dwight L. Moody, American evangelist and publisher, founded Moody Church, Moody Bible Institute, and Moody Publishers (d. 1899)
1840 – John Boyd Dunlop, Scottish businessman, co-founded Dunlop Rubber (d. 1921)
  1840   – Hiram Maxim, American engineer, invented the Maxim gun (d. 1916)
1847 – Eduard Magnus Jakobson, Estonian missionary and engraver (d. 1903)
1848 – Joris-Karl Huysmans, French author and critic (d. 1907)
  1848   – Ignacio Carrera Pinto, Chilean lieutenant (d. 1882)
1852 – Terauchi Masatake, Japanese field marshal and politician, 9th Prime Minister of Japan (d. 1919)
1866 – Domhnall Ua Buachalla, Irish politician, 3rd and last Governor-General of the Irish Free State (d. 1963)
1870 – Charles Edmund Brock, British painter and book illustrator (d. 1938)
1876 – Ernie McLea, Canadian ice hockey player (d. 1931)
1878 – André Citroën, French engineer and businessman, founded Citroën (d. 1935)
1880 – Gabriel Voisin, French pilot and engineer (d. 1973)
1889 – Patsy Hendren, English cricketer and footballer (d. 1962)
  1889   – Ernest Tyldesley, English cricketer (d. 1962)
  1889   – Recep Peker, Turkish officer and politician (d. 1950)
1891 – Renato Petronio, Italian rower (d. 1976)
1892 – Elizabeth Ryan, American tennis player (d. 1979)
1897 – Dirk Stikker, Dutch businessman and politician, 3rd Secretary General of NATO (d. 1979)
1900 – Adlai Stevenson II, American soldier, politician, and diplomat, 5th United States Ambassador to the United Nations (d. 1965)

1901–present
1903 – Koto Matsudaira, Japanese diplomat, ambassador to the United Nations (d. 1994)
  1903   – Joan Whitney Payson, American businesswoman and philanthropist (d. 1975)
1906 – John Carradine, American actor (d. 1988)
1907 – Birgit Dalland, Norwegian politician (d. 2007)
  1907   – Pierre Pflimlin, French politician, Prime Minister of France (d. 2000)
1908 – Marie Baron, Dutch swimmer and diver (d. 1948)
  1908   – Peg Entwistle, Welsh-American actress (d. 1932)
  1908   – Eugen Weidmann, German criminal (d. 1939)
1909 – Grażyna Bacewicz, Polish violinist and composer (d. 1969)
1910 – Charles Philippe Leblond, French-Canadian biologist and academic (d. 2007)
  1910   – Francisco Varallo, Argentinian footballer (d. 2010)
1911 – Jussi Björling, Swedish tenor (d. 1960)
1914 – William S. Burroughs, American novelist, short story writer, and essayist (d. 1997)
  1914   – Alan Lloyd Hodgkin, English physiologist, biophysicist, and academic, Nobel Prize laureate (d. 1998)
1915 – Robert Hofstadter, American physicist and academic, Nobel Prize laureate (d. 1990)
1917 – Edward J. Mortola, American academic and president of Pace University (d. 2002)
  1917   – Isuzu Yamada, Japanese actress (d. 2012)
1919 – Red Buttons, American actor (d. 2006)
  1919   – Tim Holt, American actor (d. 1973)
  1919   – Andreas Papandreou, Greek economist and politician, Prime Minister of Greece (d. 1996)
1921 – Ken Adam, German-born English production designer and art director (d. 2016)
1923 – Claude King, American country music singer-songwriter and guitarist (d. 2013)
  1923   – James E. Bowman, American physician and academic (d. 2011)
1924 – Duraisamy Simon Lourdusamy, Indian cardinal (d. 2014)
1927 – Robert Allen, American pianist and composer (d. 2000)
  1927   – Jacob Veldhuyzen van Zanten, Dutch captain and pilot (d. 1977)
1928 – Hristu Cândroveanu, Romanian editor, literary critic and writer (d. 2013)
  1928   – Tage Danielsson, Swedish author, actor, and director (d. 1985)
  1928   – Andrew Greeley, American priest, sociologist, and author (d. 2013)
  1928   – P. J. Vatikiotis, Israeli-American historian and political scientist (d. 1997)
1929 – Hal Blaine, American session drummer (d. 2019)
  1929   – Luc Ferrari, French pianist and composer (d. 2005)
  1929   – Fred Sinowatz, Austrian politician, 19th Chancellor of Austria (d. 2008)
1932 – Cesare Maldini, Italian footballer and manager (d. 2016)
1933 – Jörn Donner, Finnish director and screenwriter (d. 2020)
  1933   – B. S. Johnson, English author, poet, and critic (d. 1973)
1934 – Hank Aaron, American baseball player (d. 2021)
  1934   – Don Cherry, Canadian ice hockey player, coach, and sportscaster
1935 – Alex Harvey, Scottish singer-songwriter and guitarist (d. 1982)
  1935   – Johannes Geldenhuys, South African military commander (d. 2018)
1936 – K. S. Nissar Ahmed, Indian poet and academic (d. 2020)
1937 – Stuart Damon, American actor and singer (d. 2021)
  1937   – Larry Hillman, Canadian ice hockey player and coach (d. 2022)
  1937   – Gaston Roelants, Belgian runner
  1937   – Alar Toomre, Estonian-American astronomer and mathematician
  1937   – Wang Xuan, Chinese computer scientist and academic (d. 2006)
1938 – Rafael Nieto Navia, Colombian lawyer, jurist, and diplomat
1939 – Brian Luckhurst, English cricketer (d. 2005)
1940 – H. R. Giger, Swiss painter, sculptor, and set designer (d. 2014)
  1940   – Luke Graham, American wrestler (d. 2006)
1941 – Stephen J. Cannell, American actor, producer, and screenwriter (d. 2010)
  1941   – Henson Cargill, American country music singer (d. 2007)
  1941   – David Selby, American actor and playwright
  1941   – Barrett Strong, American soul singer-songwriter and pianist (d. 2023)

  1941   – Kaspar Villiger, Swiss engineer and politician, 85th President of the Swiss Confederation
  1941   – Cory Wells, American pop-rock singer (d. 2015)
1942 – Roger Staubach, American football player,  sportscaster, and businessman
1943 – Nolan Bushnell, American engineer and businessman, founded Atari, Inc.
  1943   – Michael Mann, American director, producer, and screenwriter
  1943   – Craig Morton, American football player and sportscaster
  1943   – Dušan Uhrin, Czech and Slovak footballer and manager
1944 – J. R. Cobb, American guitarist and songwriter (d. 2019)
  1944   – Henfil, Brazilian journalist, author, and illustrator (d. 1988)
  1944   – Al Kooper, American singer-songwriter and producer 
  1944   – Tamanoumi Masahiro, Japanese sumo wrestler, the 51st Yokozuna (d. 1971)
1945 – Douglas Hogg, English lawyer and politician, Minister of Agriculture, Fisheries and Food
1946 – Amnon Dankner, Israeli journalist and author (d. 2013)
  1946   – Charlotte Rampling, English actress
1947 – Mary L. Cleave, American engineer and astronaut
  1947   – Clemente Mastella, Italian politician, Italian Minister of Justice
  1947   – Darrell Waltrip, American race car driver and sportscaster
1948 – Sven-Göran Eriksson, Swedish footballer and manager
  1948   – Christopher Guest, American actor and director
  1948   – Barbara Hershey, American actress
  1948   – Errol Morris, American director and producer
  1948   – Tom Wilkinson, English actor 
1949 – Kurt Beck, German politician
  1949   – Maidarjavyn Ganzorig, Mongolian cosmonaut and academic (d. 2021)
  1949   – Yvon Vallières, Canadian educator and politician
1950 – Jonathan Freeman, American actor and singer
  1950   – Rafael Puente, Mexican footballer
1951 – Nikolay Merkushkin, Mordovian engineer and politician, 1st Head of the Republic of Mordovia
1952 – Daniel Balavoine, French singer-songwriter and producer (d. 1986)
  1952   – Vladimir Moskovkin, Ukrainian-Russian geographer, economist, and academic
1953 – Freddie Aguilar, Filipino singer-songwriter and guitarist
  1953   – John Beilein, American basketball player and coach
  1953   – Gustavo Benítez, Paraguayan footballer and manager
1954 – Cliff Martinez, American drummer and songwriter 
  1954   – Frank Walker, Australian journalist and author
1955 – Mike Heath, American baseball player and manager
1956 – Vinnie Colaiuta, American drummer
  1956   – Héctor Rebaque, Mexican race car driver
  1956   – David Wiesner, American author and illustrator
  1956   – Mao Daichi, Japanese actress
1957 – Jüri Tamm, Estonian hammer thrower and politician (d. 2021)
1959 – Jennifer Granholm, Canadian-American lawyer and politician, 47th Governor of Michigan
1960 – Aris Christofellis, Greek soprano and musicologist
  1960   – Bonnie Crombie, Canadian businesswoman and politician, 6th Mayor of Mississauga
  1960   – Micky Hazard, English footballer 
1961 – Savvas Kofidis, Greek footballer and manager
  1961   – Tim Meadows, American actor and screenwriter
1962 – Jennifer Jason Leigh, American actress, screenwriter, producer and director
1963 – Steven Shainberg, American film director and producer
1964 – Laura Linney, American actress
  1964   – Ha Seung-moo, Korean poet, pastor, historical theologian
  1964   – Duff McKagan, American singer-songwriter, bass player, and producer
1965 – Tarik Benhabiles, Algerian-French tennis player and coach
  1965   – Gheorghe Hagi, Romanian footballer and manager 
  1965   – Keith Moseley, American bass player and songwriter 
  1965   – Quique Sánchez Flores, Spanish footballer and manager
1966 – José María Olazábal, Spanish golfer
  1966   – Rok Petrovič, Slovenian skier (d. 1993)
1967 – Chris Parnell, American actor and comedian
1968 – Roberto Alomar, Puerto Rican-American baseball player and coach
  1968   – Marcus Grönholm, Finnish race car driver
1969 – Bobby Brown, American singer-songwriter, dancer, and actor
  1969   – Michael Sheen, Welsh actor and director
  1969   – Derek Stephen Prince, American voice actor
1970 – Jean-Marc Jaumin, Belgian basketball player and coach
  1970   – Darren Lehmann, Australian cricketer and coach
  1970   – Jeremy Rockliff, Australian politician, 47th Premier of Tasmania
1971 – Michel Breistroff, French ice hockey player (d. 1996)
  1971   – Sara Evans, American country singer
1972 – Mary, Crown Princess of Denmark
  1972   – Brad Fittler, Australian rugby league player, coach, and sportscaster
1973 – Richard Matvichuk, Canadian ice hockey player and coach
  1973   – Trijntje Oosterhuis, Dutch singer-songwriter
  1973   – Luke Ricketson, Australian rugby league player and sportscaster
1974 – Michael Maguire, Australian rugby league player and coach
1975 – Giovanni van Bronckhorst, Dutch footballer and manager
1976 – John Aloisi, Australian footballer and manager
  1976   – Abhishek Bachchan, Indian actor
1977 – Ben Ainslie, English sailor
  1977   – Adam Dykes, Australian rugby league player
  1977   – Adam Everett, American baseball player and coach
1978 – Brian Russell, American football player
  1978   – Samuel Sánchez, Spanish cyclist
1979 – Nate Holzapfel, American entrepreneur and television personality
1980 – Brad Fitzpatrick, American programmer, created LiveJournal
  1980   – Jo Swinson, Scottish politician
1981 – Mia Hansen-Løve, French director and screenwriter 
  1981   – Loukas Vyntra, Czech-Greek footballer
1982 – Laura del Río, Spanish footballer
  1982   – Kevin Everett, American football player
  1982   – Tomáš Kopecký, Slovak ice hockey player
  1982   – Rodrigo Palacio, Argentinian footballer
1983 – Anja Hammerseng-Edin, Norwegian handball player
1984 – Carlos Tevez, Argentinian footballer
1985 – Lloyd Johansson, Australian rugby player
  1985   – Laurence Maroney, American football player
  1985   – Paul Vandervort, American actor, film producer, and former model
  1985   – Cristiano Ronaldo, Portuguese footballer
1986 – Vedran Ćorluka, Croatian footballer
  1986   – Kevin Gates, American rapper, singer, and entrepreneur
  1986   – Sekope Kepu, Australian rugby player
  1986   – Billy Sharp, English footballer
  1986   – Reed Sorenson, American race car driver
  1986   – Carlos Villanueva, Chilean footballer
1987 – Darren Criss, American actor, singer, and entrepreneur
  1987   – Curtis Jerrells, American basketball player
  1987   – Alex Kuznetsov, Ukrainian-American tennis player
  1987   – Linus Omark, Swedish ice hockey player
  1987   – Donald Sanford, American-Israeli sprinter
1988 – Karin Ontiveros, Mexican model
1989 – Marina Melnikova, Russian tennis player
1990 – Dmitry Andreikin, Russian chess player
  1990   – Bhuvneshwar Kumar, Indian cricketer
  1990   – Jordan Rhodes, Scottish footballer
1991 – Nabil Bahoui, Swedish footballer
  1991   – Gerald Tusha, Albanian footballer
1992 – Stefan de Vrij, Dutch footballer
  1992   – Neymar, Brazilian footballer
1993 – Leilani Latu, Australian rugby league player
  1993   – Ty Rattie, Canadian ice hockey player
1995 – Adnan Januzaj, Belgian-Albanian footballer
1996 – Stina Blackstenius, Swedish footballer  
1997 – Patrick Roberts, English footballer
2016 – Jigme Namgyel Wangchuck, Bhutanese prince

Deaths

Pre-1600
 523 – Avitus of Vienne, Gallo-Roman bishop
 806 – Kanmu, emperor of Japan (b. 736)
 994 – William IV, duke of Aquitaine (b. 937)
1015 – Adelaide, German abbess and saint
1036 – Alfred Aetheling, Anglo-Saxon prince
1146 – Zafadola, Arab emir of Zaragoza
1578 – Giovanni Battista Moroni, Italian painter (b. 1520)

1601–1900
1661 – Shunzhi, Chinese emperor of the Qing Dynasty (b. 1638)
1705 – Philipp Spener, German theologian and author (b. 1635)
1751 – Henri François d'Aguesseau, French jurist and politician, Chancellor of France (b. 1668)
1754 – Nicolaas Kruik, Dutch astronomer and cartographer (b. 1678)
1766 – Count Leopold Joseph von Daun, Austrian field marshal (b. 1705)
1775 – Eusebius Amort, German theologian and academic (b. 1692)
1790 – William Cullen, Scottish physician and chemist (b. 1710)
1807 – Pasquale Paoli, Corsican commander and politician (b. 1725)
1818 – Charles XIII, king of Sweden (b. 1748)
1881 – Thomas Carlyle, Scottish philosopher, historian, and academic (b. 1795)
1882 – Adolfo Rivadeneyra, Spanish orientalist and diplomat (b. 1841)
1892 – Emilie Flygare-Carlén, Swedish author (b. 1807)

1901–present
1915 – Ross Barnes, American baseball player and manager (b. 1850)
1917 – Jaber II Al-Sabah, Kuwaiti ruler (b. 1860)
1922 – Slavoljub Eduard Penkala, Croatian engineer, invented the mechanical pencil (b. 1871)
1927 – Inayat Khan, Indian mystic and educator (b. 1882)
1931 – Athanasios Eftaxias, Greek politician, 118th Prime Minister of Greece (b. 1849)
1933 – Josiah Thomas, English-Australian miner and politician (b. 1863)
1937 – Lou Andreas-Salomé, Russian-German psychoanalyst and author (b. 1861)
1938 – Hans Litten, German lawyer and jurist (b. 1903)
1941 – Banjo Paterson, Australian journalist, author, and poet (b. 1864)
  1941   – Otto Strandman, Estonian lawyer and politician, 1st Prime Minister of Estonia (b. 1875)
1946 – George Arliss, English actor and playwright (b. 1868)
1948 – Johannes Blaskowitz, German general (b. 1883)
1952 – Adela Verne, English pianist and composer (b. 1877)
1954 – Hossein Sami'i, Iranian politician, diplomat, writer and poet (b. 1876)
1955 – Victor Houteff, Bulgarian religious reformer and author (b. 1885)
1957 – Sami Ibrahim Haddad, Lebanese surgeon and author (b. 1890)
1962 – Jacques Ibert, French-Swiss composer (b. 1890)
1967 – Leon Leonwood Bean, American businessman, founded L.L.Bean (b. 1872)
1969 – Thelma Ritter, American actress (b. 1902)
1970 – Rudy York, American baseball player, coach, and manager (b. 1913)
1972 – Marianne Moore, American poet, author, critic, and translator (b. 1887)
1976 – Rudy Pompilli, American saxophonist (Bill Haley & His Comets) (b. 1926)
1977 – Oskar Klein, Swedish physicist and academic (b. 1894)
1981 – Ella Grasso, American politician, 83rd Governor of Connecticut (b. 1919)
1982 – Neil Aggett, Kenyan-South African physician and union leader (b. 1953)
1983 – Margaret Oakley Dayhoff, American chemist and academic (b. 1925)
1987 – William Collier Jr., American actor and producer (b. 1902)
1989 – Joe Raposo, American pianist and composer (b. 1937)
1991 – Dean Jagger, American actor (b. 1903)
1992 – Miguel Rolando Covian, Argentinian-Brazilian physiologist and academic (b. 1913)
1993 – Seán Flanagan, Irish footballer and politician, 7th Irish Minister for Health (b. 1922)
  1993   – Joseph L. Mankiewicz, American director, producer, and screenwriter (b. 1909)
  1993   – William Pène du Bois, American author and illustrator (b. 1916)
1995 – Doug McClure, American actor (b. 1935)
1997 – Pamela Harriman, English-American diplomat, 58th United States Ambassador to France (b. 1920)
  1997   – René Huyghe, French historian and author (b. 1906)
1998 – Tim Kelly, American guitarist (b. 1963)
1999 – Wassily Leontief, Russian-American economist and academic, Nobel Prize laureate (b. 1906)
2000 – Claude Autant-Lara, French director and screenwriter (b. 1901)
2004 – John Hench, American animator (b. 1908)
2005 – Gnassingbé Eyadéma, Togolese general and politician, President of Togo (b. 1937)
  2005   – Michalina Wisłocka, Polish gynecologist and sexologist (b. 1921)
2006 – Norma Candal, Puerto Rican-American actress (b. 1927)
2007 – Leo T. McCarthy, New Zealand-American soldier, lawyer, and politician, 43rd Lieutenant Governor of California (b. 1930)
2008 – Maharishi Mahesh Yogi, Indian guru, founded Transcendental Meditation (b. 1918)
2010 – Brendan Burke, Canadian ice hockey player and activist (b. 1988)
  2010   – Harry Schwarz, South African lawyer, anti-apartheid leader, and diplomat, 13th South Africa Ambassador to United States (b. 1924)
2011 – Brian Jacques, English author and radio host (b. 1939)
  2011   – Peggy Rea, American actress and casting director (b. 1921)
2012 – Sam Coppola, American actor (b. 1932)
  2012   – Al De Lory, American keyboard player, conductor, and producer (b. 1930)
  2012   – John Turner Sargent Sr., American publisher (b. 1924)
  2012   – Jo Zwaan, Dutch sprinter (b. 1922)
2013 – Reinaldo Gargano, Uruguayan journalist and politician, Minister of Foreign Affairs for Uruguay (b. 1934)
  2013   – Egil Hovland, Norwegian composer and conductor (b. 1924)
  2013   – Tom McGuigan, New Zealand soldier and politician, 23rd New Zealand Minister of Health (b. 1921)
2014 – Robert Dahl, American political scientist and academic (b. 1915)
2015 – K. N. Choksy, Sri Lankan lawyer and politician, Minister of Finance of Sri Lanka (b. 1933)
  2015   – Marisa Del Frate, Italian actress and singer (b. 1931)
  2015   – Val Logsdon Fitch, American physicist and academic, Nobel Prize laureate (b. 1923)
  2015   – Herman Rosenblat, Polish-American author (b. 1929)
2016 – Ciriaco Cañete, Filipino martial artist (b. 1919)
2020 – Kirk Douglas,  American actor (b. 1916)
2021 – Christopher Plummer, Canadian actor (b. 1929)
2023 – Pervez Musharraf, Pakistani military officer and politician, 10th President of Pakistan (b. 1943)

Holidays and observances
 Christian feast day:
 Adelaide of Vilich
 Agatha of Sicily
 Avitus of Vienne
 Bertulf (Bertoul) of Renty
 Ingenuinus (Jenewein)
 Roger Williams, Anne Hutchinson (Episcopal Church (United States))
 26 Martyrs of Japan (in Evangelical Lutheran Church in America and Anglican Church in Japan)
 February 5 (Eastern Orthodox liturgics)
 Constitution Day (Mexico)
 Crown Princess Mary's birthday (Denmark)
 Kashmir Solidarity Day (Pakistan)
 Liberation Day (San Marino)
 Runeberg's Birthday (Finland)
 Unity Day (Burundi)

References

Sources

External links

 BBC: On This Day
 
 Historical Events on February 5

Days of the year
February